ECAC 2 was an intercollegiate athletic conference affiliated with the NCAA's College Division. The league was created as a way to fairly divide the upper- and lower-class programs that had been members of ECAC Hockey. In 1984 the conference was split in two, creating ECAC East and ECAC West as completely independent leagues.

History

Foundation
In 1950 college ice hockey received its first official conference, the Tri State League, and while the conference possessed a minimal number of teams it routinely received one of the two eastern bids to the NCAA tournament. Concurrently, once seven western schools formed their own conference they were able to earn both western bids each year because there were no other colleges in competition for tournament berths. This situation left one eastern bid available for at least two dozen eastern schools. The arrangement came to a head in 1961 when both eastern bids were given to Tri State League teams and very soon thereafter ECAC Hockey was formed. Following the same pattern as the western schools, every available eastern college joined the league, including the three remaining members of the Tri State League, and the 28-team mega conference was born.

Due to the sheer number of universities in the conference none of the teams could guarantee playing each other so from the outset the conference standings were deemphasized and the eight teams that played in the conference tournament were selected by a committee based upon their perceived strength. This led to some schools like Williams, who finished 4th in the standings in 1962, not being invited to the tournament despite a 16–3–1 record against other ECAC schools because of their assumed weaker competition.

Split
The giant league remained in place for three seasons before being split in two. 15 teams that were willing to invest greater amounts of time, effort and money to their ice hockey programs remained in ECAC Hockey while the remaining 14 schools joined in a new league, ECAC 2. ECAC 2 was the first ice hockey conference formed for the NCAA College Division (which would later become Division III and Division II) and was virtually the only collection of schools in the country that played at the lower tier. After only seven years the conference had doubled in size and once again created a lower tier (ECAC 3) though only six schools chose to leave for the lesser division in 1971.

Further Growth and Dissolution
ECAC 2 remained the primary conference outside Division I for several years but started getting some competition in the 1970s. In that time, however, the conference continued to grow larger until it possessed over 30 members by 1975 and divided itself internally into two divisions (East and West) which would continue for another decade.

In 1978, five years after dividing the college division into two numerical divisions, the NCAA began the NCAA Division II Men's Ice Hockey Championship and the inaugural title was won by ECAC 2 member, Merrimack. ECAC 2 would win four more championships over the next five years and established itself as the premier league at the Division II level. In 1983, the NCAA announced that it would begin hosting a Division III Championship and require all schools who normally played at that level to submit bids for the new tournament. Even though ECAC 2 technically competed at the D-II level that year, most of its member teams that made tournament appearances did so in the D-III series.

With the vast majority of all programs needing to reclassify for the D-III tournament, ECAC 2 dropped down to the lower level in the summer of 1984. That change, however, was not enough to keep the league as one entity. During the season, it was divided into two conferences with both ECAC East and ECAC West holding separate tournaments at the end of the year.

Legacy
Most of the 46 programs that played in the ECAC 2 are still going as of 2018, with many having jumped up to the Division I ranks. While several schools have won Division III national titles in the years since the conference ended, both Maine and Union have won Division I national titles.

ECAC 2 Tournament
The ECAC 2 played a conference tournament from 1967 through its final full season in 1984. The tournament served as the de facto Division II National Championship until the NCAA instituted a national tournament in 1978. That year ECAC 2 effectively split its conference in two by having two division tournaments (East and West) with all games between the two divisions counting for the regular season.

Member schools
In its 20-year existence ECAC 2 had 45 individual schools as members. 

# enrollment in 2018† as of 2018

Membership timeline

See also
 ECAC Hockey
 ECAC East
 ECAC West
 ECAC 3

References

NCAA Division II conferences